Néstor Nicolás Trecco (born 30 November 1988) is an Argentine footballer that currently plays for Barracas Central as striker.

Career
He began his career at El Linqueño aged 19, then moving to Parque Patricios' side Huracán. In January 2011, Trecco signed for Primera División club Unión San Felipe and after a successful season with the club of Aconcagua, he joined to Cobreloa in June, being runner-up of the Clausura Tournament with Nelson Acosta. The next season, Trecco completed his move to successful club of Chile, Universidad Católica for an undisclosed fee.

References

External links
 Cruzados.cl Profile
 Nicolás Trecco at Football-Lineups

1988 births
Living people
Argentine footballers
Argentine expatriate footballers
Club Atlético Huracán footballers
Cobreloa footballers
Unión San Felipe footballers
Rangers de Talca footballers
Club Deportivo Universidad Católica footballers
L.D.U. Portoviejo footballers
Deportivo Roca players
Mons Calpe S.C. players
Club Cipolletti footballers
Barracas Central players
Chilean Primera División players
Gibraltar Premier Division players
Ecuadorian Serie A players
Primera B de Chile players
Argentine Primera División players
Torneo Argentino A players
Torneo Argentino B players
Association football forwards
Argentine expatriate sportspeople in Chile
Argentine expatriate sportspeople in Ecuador
Argentine expatriate sportspeople in Gibraltar
Expatriate footballers in Chile
Expatriate footballers in Ecuador
Expatriate footballers in Gibraltar
Sportspeople from Buenos Aires Province